Dundas is an unincorporated community and census-designated place in Richland County, Illinois, United States. Dundas has a post office with ZIP code 62425. It has a population of 503.

Demographics

References

Unincorporated communities in Richland County, Illinois
Unincorporated communities in Illinois